Chris Vos (born 25 February 1998 in Haarlem, Netherlands) is a Dutch para-snowboarder. At age five Vos got into an accident which resulted in his right leg being paralyzed. Vos currently lives in Noordbeemster, Netherlands. He has a relationship with Lisa Bunschoten.

Education
Vos follows an MBO education at the Johan Cruyff College, Nijmegen, Netherlands.

Career
Vos made his debut in April 2011 during the World Cup in Ocieres, France.

Winter Paralympics
Vos qualified for the 2014 Winter Paralympics in Sotsji, Russia. He did this by coming in fourth in the Europa Cup in Landgraaf, Netherlands. He participated in the boardercross event where he ranked 13th.

Vos again qualified for the 2018 Winter Paralympics in Pyeongchang, South Korea where he participated in boardercross and banked slalom. He won a silver medal in the boardercross event.

Vos and Lisa Bunschoten were the flagbearers for the Netherlands during the opening ceremony of the 2022 Winter Paralympics in Beijing, China. He won the silver medal in the men's banked slalom SB-LL1 event.

X Games
In 2015, Vos was invited to participate in the X Games. The X Games are an annual event held in Aspen, Colorado, U.S. The event is invite only. Vos reached the finals and ultimately ranked 8th. He was invited once more in 2016.

Outside sport
Vos has served as an ambassador for the Johan Cruyff Foundation in the Netherlands.

In 2010, Vos participated in a Dutch TV show called Cappies Award which was broadcast by TROS and presented by Lucille Werner. The show aimed to show the things handicapped children could do, rather than the things they couldn't. In the show Vos was introduced to Bibian Mentel who gave him a medal for his effort. Mentel proclaimed that she hoped that she and Vos would participate in the 2014 Winter Paralympics together, which happened.

Vos is a member of the Mentelity Foundation, a foundation that seeks to get children with a handicap to participate in sport.

Awards
 Received the Sportpenning from the Beemster municipal government
 Was named Allianz Athlete of the Month for February 2015 by the International Paralympic Committee

References

External links 
 
 Chris Vos at World Para Snowboard
 

1998 births
Living people
Dutch male snowboarders
Paralympic snowboarders of the Netherlands
Paralympic medalists in snowboarding
Paralympic silver medalists for the Netherlands
Snowboarders at the 2014 Winter Paralympics
Snowboarders at the 2018 Winter Paralympics
Snowboarders at the 2022 Winter Paralympics
Medalists at the 2018 Winter Paralympics
Medalists at the 2022 Winter Paralympics
Sportspeople from Haarlem